Rulership may refer to:

 The position or quality of a ruler, see also Sovereignty
 A government or the territory under its control
 In astrology, the influence of a planet, see also Domicile (astrology)